Prof John Neil Loughhead CB OBE FREng FIMechE FIET (born 24 September 1948) is a British businessman and Chief Scientific Adviser to Department for Business, Energy and Industrial Strategy (BEIS). He is also a Fellow of the Royal Academy of Engineering, Chair of the Energy research partnership and was formerly the Executive Director of the UK Energy Research Centre. He was appointed an OBE for services to Technology in 2011. In 2014, he was voted as one of the Top 500 Most Influential People in Britain by Debrett's and The Sunday Times.

Education 
He attended Bemrose Grammar School in Derby, a boys' grammar school.

John Loughhead graduated in Mechanical Engineering from Imperial College London, where he also spent five years in computational fluid dynamics research. He is Honorary Professor of Cardiff University, Honorary Fellow of Queen Mary University of London, Fellow of both the UK and Australian national Academies of Engineering, and a Freeman of the City of London.

Career 

John Loughhead was Corporate Vice-President of Technology and Intellectual Property at Alstom. He joined the UK Energy Research Centre in 2004 as executive director. He is currently the UK member of the European Energy Research Alliance, a member of the European Advisory Group on Energy, and Advisor to the European Commission Directorate-General Research, Assessor for the Technology Strategy Board, Non-Executive Director of the Ministry of Defence (United Kingdom) Research & Development Board, and a member of the UK's Energy Research Partnership. He was also Co-Chair of the Implementation Panel of the European Commission Hydrogen and Fuel Cell Technology Platform, which produced the future plan for European fuel cell commercialisation, and is currently Co-Chair of the Implementation Committee of the International Partnership for the Hydrogen Economy. He was previously a member of EPSRC Council and Past-President of the UK's Institution of Engineering and Technology.

In 2013, John Loughhead was appointed as the UK's Focal Point contact for China in the area of energy and renewables until January 2015. Later in 2013 he was appointed chair of an independent science board overseeing a trans-European fracking research project.

In October 2014, John Loughhead was appointed Chief Scientific Adviser to the UK Department of Energy and Climate Change (DECC), which was merged with the Department for Business, Innovation and Skills in 2016 to become the Department for Business, Energy and Industrial Strategy (BEIS), where he now works to ensure that the Department's policies and operations, and its contributions to wider Government issues, are underpinned by the best science and engineering advice available.

Awards 

John is a Chartered Engineer, a Fellow of the Royal Academy of Engineering, a Fellow and Past-President (2008) of the Institution of Engineering and Technology, and Fellow of the Institution of Mechanical Engineers, the City & Guilds of London Institute, and the Royal Society of Arts.

He was appointed an OBE for services to Technology in Queen's Birthday Honours List in June 2011. In January 2014, he was voted as one of the Top 500 Most Influential People in Britain by Debrett's and The Sunday Times.

He was made a Companion of the Order of the Bath for services to Research and Development in the Energy Sector in the Queen's Birthday Honours List in June 2018.

See also

 Alstom
 UK Energy Research Centre
 Energy research partnership
 Department of Energy and Climate Change

References

External links
The UK Energy Research Centre's website
The Durham University Refine Project website

Living people
1948 births
Alstom
Alumni of Imperial College London
English mechanical engineers
Fellows of the Institution of Engineering and Technology
Fellows of the Institution of Mechanical Engineers
Fellows of the Royal Academy of Engineering
General Electric Company
People educated at Bemrose School
People from Derby
Companions of the Order of the Bath
Officers of the Order of the British Empire
Fellows of the Australian Academy of Technological Sciences and Engineering
Foreign members of the Chinese Academy of Engineering
Engineers from Yorkshire